Nyi Roro Kidul (or Nyai Rara Kidul, Sundanese: ᮑᮤ ᮛᮛ ᮊᮤᮓᮥᮜ᮪, Javanese: ꦚꦻ​ꦫꦫ​ꦏꦶꦢꦸꦭ꧀, Balinese: ᬜᬶᬭᭀᬭᭀᬓᬶᬤᬸᬮ᭄) is a supernatural being in Indonesian folklore. She is the Queen of the Southern Sea in Sundanese and Javanese mythology.

In Javanese mythology, Kanjeng Ratu Kidul is a creation of Dewa Kaping Telu who fills the realm of life as the goddess of harvest and other goddesses of nature. Meanwhile, Nyi Roro Kidul was originally the daughter of Sunda Kingdom who was expelled by her father because of her stepmother.

In its development, people tend to equate Nyi Roro Kidul with Kanjeng Ratu Kidul, although in Kejawen belief, Nyi Roro Kidul is a loyal subordinate of Kanjeng Ratu Kidul.

Nyi Roro Kidul's position as the Phantom Queen of Java is a popular motif in folklore and mythology, as well as being associated with the beauty of Sundanese princesses.

Etymology
Nyi Roro Kidul is also known by various names that reflect different stories of her origins, legends, mythology, and hereditary stories. She is commonly called by the names Ratu Laut Selatan and Gusti Kanjeng Ratu Kidul. According to Javanese customs, the use of honorific such as Nyai, Kanjeng, and Gusti to refer to her is essential for the sake of politeness.

Sometimes people also refer to her as Nyai Loro Kidul. Javanese loro is a homograph for "two - 2" and "pain, suffering". While Javanese of rara (or roro) means "girl". A Dutch orthographer predicted a change from the old Javanese roro to the new Javanese loro, resulting in a change in meaning from "beautiful girl" to "sick person".

Origin and history
Sundanese people know a legend about the spiritual ruler of the Southern Sea in the form of a beautiful woman called Nyi Rara Kidul. The legend originated from the Sunda Kingdom Pajajaran of the 15th century is older than that of the Islamic Mataram Kingdom of the 18th century. However, research into the cultural anthropology of the Javanese and Sundanese peoples suggests that the legend of Java's Queen of the Southern Sea may have originated from a much older prehistoric animistic belief, a pre-Hindu-Buddhist goddess of the southern ocean. The fierce Indian Ocean waves of Java's southern coast, its storms and sometimes tsunamis, may have evoked a sense of reverence and fear for the forces of nature, which came to be regarded as the spiritual realm of the gods and ancestors inhabiting the southern seas led by their queen, a goddess, later identified as Ratu Kidul.

Dewi Kadita
One of the Sundanese folktales tells the story of Dewi Kadita, a beautiful princess of the Sunda kingdom Pajajaran who fled to the southern ocean after being cursed. The curse was cast by a shaman at the behest of a rival in the palace, and left the princess with a disgusting skin disease. She jumped into the violent waves of the ocean but she instead was cured and restored to beauty. The phantoms then made her the legendary Phantom Queen of the Southern Sea.

A similar version is Kandita, the only daughter of King Munding Wangi of Galuh Pakuan. Because of her beauty, she was nicknamed Dewi Srêngéngé ("Sun Goddess"). Despite having a beautiful daughter, King Munding Wangi was saddened that he did not have a son to succeed him as king. The king then marry Dewi Mutiara and have a son from their marriage.

Dewi Mutiara wanted her son to become king without any obstacles in the future, so she tries to get rid of Kandita. Dewi Mutiara went to The King and asked him to ban Kandita away from the palace. The King said that he would not let anyone who wanted to be rude to his daughter. Hearing this, Dewi Mutiara smiled and speak sweet words until The King no longer mad at her.

The next day, before sunrise, Dewi Mutiara sent her servant to summon a shaman. She told the shaman to cast a curse on Kandita. By nightfall, Kandita's body was itchy with scabies, foul smelling and full of boils. She cried not knowing what to do. The King invited many healers to cure Kandita and realized that the disease was not natural, it must have come from curse. Dewi Mutiara forced The King to ban his daughter away as she would bring bad luck to the whole kingdom. Since The King did not want his daughter to be the talk of the whole kingdom, he was forced to agree to Dewi Mutiara's proposal to exile his daughter from the kingdom.

Kandita wandered alone aimlessly and could hardly cry anymore. She did not hold a grudge against her stepmother, but requested for Sanghyang Kersa to accompany her in her suffering. After almost seven days and seven nights, she finally arrived at the Southern Sea. The ocean water was clean and clear, unlike other oceans that were blue or green. Suddenly she heard a supernatural voice telling her to jump into the Southern Sea. She jumped in and swam, and the waters of the Southern Sea removed her boils without leaving a mark, making her even more beautiful. She had power over the Southern Sea and became a goddess called Nyi Roro Kidul who lived forever. The place of Palabuhanratu Bay is particularly associated with this legend.

Princess Banyu Bening Gelang Kencana
Another Sundanese folktale mention Banyoe Bening (meaning clear water) becomes Queen of the Djojo Koelon Kingdom. She suffer leprosy, travels to the south where she is taken up by a huge wave to disappear into the Ocean.

Princess Aurora Balqis
According to spiritual teachers, of course they have defeated her power, Nyi Roro Kidul or Princess Aurora Balqis was born when Queen of Sheba exiled herself and meditate of sadness after the decease of King Solomon because the land was again on the verge of destruction and misguidance, In her hermitage she married the King of Djinn and Aurora Balqis was born without physical body as a pure djinn, finally she ordered her troops to throw her child into the sea of Aljawi and was found and raised by The Queen of the Southern Sea. Although in Kejawen and spiritual beliefs, Princess Roro Kidul is an outcast princess from land of Sheba.

After growing up, she was given abilities and power with a jeweled scepter and shawl, his scepter was stronger than Nyi Blorong's, the shawl weapon could be used to summon huge waves and winds in the southern sea coast.

Then she built a kingdom on the right of the southern coast to accompany the Queen of the Southern Sea who loved her very much as a daughter. She always waited for orders from The Queen of the Southern Sea as her adoptive mother and is said to have never married.

When Sunan Gunung Jati introduced Sunan Kalijaga to Queen of the Southern Sea Rara Kadita, and Nyi Roro Kidul Aurora Balqis was also converted by the two Waliullah.

Legend and belief
Nyi Roro Kidul is sometimes depicted in the form of a mermaid with her lower body in the form of a snake or fish, sometimes also depicted as a very beautiful woman. She is believed to take the soul of anyone she wants. Sometimes she is said to have the form of a snake. This belief may stem from the legend about Princess of Pajajaran who suffered from leprosy. Her skin disease was probably thought to be the same as a snake shedding its skin.

Pati of the army of the Southern Sea
Nyi Roro Kidul is believed to be the pati of Kanjeng Ratu Kidul who leads the army of phantoms in the southern sea. Kiai Iman Sampurno from Blitar, East Java (19th century) issued a prophecy that Nyi Roro Kidul and Sunan Lawu would lead their respective armies and spread plague to humans who behaved badly.

Ban on green garment
There is a local belief that wearing green garment will bring the wearer bad luck, as green is Nyi Roro Kidul's favorite color. Sea green (gadhung m'lathi in Javanese) is Nyi Roro Kidul's favorite color and no one should wear the color along the southern coast of Java. Warnings are always given to people visiting the southern coast not to wear green garment. The myth is that they could be targeted by Nyai Rara Kidul to become her soldiers or servants (slaves). Logically, the reason arises because water in the southern coast tends to be greenish in color so that drowning victims wearing green garment will be difficult to find.

Serat Centhini mentions that Gusti Kanjeng Nyai Rara Kidul has kampuh gadhung mlathi or "a long green dodot cloth with a white center" that is gold-toned.

Swallow nest
Sarang Burung are Javanese bird's nests, and are some of the finest in the world. The edible bird's nests, in the form of bird's nest soup or sarang burung,  find a ready market in Thailand, Malaysia, Singapore are dedicated to Nyi Roro Kidul, mentioned by Sultan Agung in reports.

There are three harvests which are known as the Unduan-Kesongo, Unduan-Telor and Unduan-Kepat, and take place in April, the latter part of August (the largest), and December. The places Rongkob and Karang Bolong along the south coast of central Java are famous for the edible bird's nests, made by the little sea swallows (so called, but actually swiftlets), called Salanganen or Collocalia fuciphaga. The harvests are famous because of the wayang performances which are held, and the Javanese ritual dances which are performed with gamelan music as the traditional ceremony.

This happens in a cave (Karang Bolong) and when these are ended specially prepared offerings are made in a shed in what is known as "Ranjang Nyi Roro Kidul". This relic is hung with beautiful silk batik clothes, and a toilet mirror is placed against the green-colored pillows of the bed.

Nyi Roro Kidul is the patron goddess of the bird's-nest gatherers of South Java. The gatherers descend the sheer cliff-face on coconut fiber ropes to an overhang some thirty feet above the water where a rickety bamboo platform has been built. From there they must await their wave, drop into it, and be swept beneath the overhang into the cave. Here they grope around in total darkness filling their bags with bird's nests. Going back needs very precise timing, to avoid misjudging the tides, and falling into the violent waves.

Palabuhanratu
Palabuhanratu, a small fishing town in West Java, Indonesia, celebrates an annual holiday in her honor on April 6. A memorial day for the locals, offering a lot of ceremonial "presents" to appease the queen. The local fishermen annually send the sedekah laut ceremony, offering gifts and sacrifices; from rice, vegetables and agricultural produces, to chicken, batik fabrics and cosmetics, to be larung (sent afloat to the sea) and finally drawn in to the sea to appease the queen. The local fishermen believe that the ceremony will please the Queen of Southern Sea, in return this would provide plentiful catches in fisheries and bless the surrounding areas with better weather, fewer storms and waves.

Nyi Roro Kidul is also associated with Parangtritis, Parangkusumo, Pangandaran, Karang Bolong, Ngliyep, Puger, Banyuwangi, and places all along the south coast of Java. There is a local belief that wearing a green garment in these areas instead of blue, purple, lavender, magenta, pink, and violet will anger her in the process and will bring misfortune on the wearer, as green is her sacred color.

Samudra Beach Hotel
The Samudra Beach Hotel, Palabuhanratu, West Java, keeps room 308 furnished with green colors and reserved for Nyai Loro Kidul. The first president of Indonesia, Sukarno, was involved with the exact location and the idea for the Samudra Beach Hotel. In front of room 308 is one Ketapang tree where Sukarno got his spiritual inspiration. The painting of Nyai Rara Kidul by Basuki Abdullah, a famous Indonesian painter, is displayed in this room.

Yogyakarta and Central Java
The legend of Queen Kidul is often associated with beaches in Yogyakarta, especially Parangkusumo and Parangtritis. Parangkusumo in particular is special since it was the place believed to be the location of the first spiritual encounter between the Queen with Panembahan Senopati. Legends recount her love for Senopati and the famous Sultan Agung of Mataram, which continues to be recounted in the ritualized Bedhaya dance by the royal line of Surakarta, and she is honored by the susuhunans of Solo/Surakarta and the sultans of Yogyakarta, Central-Java. When Sri Sultan Hamengkubuwono IX died on October 3, 1988, the Tempo newsmagazine reported her sighting by palace servants, who were sure that she was paying her final tribute to the deceased King.

Kanjeng Ratu Kidul
Nyi Roro Kidul is often equated with Kanjeng Ratu Kidul, though they are different individuals.

Kanjeng Ratu Kidul is often illustrated as a mermaid with a tail as well as the lower body parts of a fish. The mythical creature is claimed to be able to take the soul of any who she wished for. According to local popular beliefs around coastal villages on Southern Java, the Queen often claims lives of fishermen or visitors that bathe on the beach, and she usually prefers handsome young men.

The role of Kanjeng Ratu Kidul as a Javanese Spirit-Queen became a popular motif in traditional Javanese folklore and palace mythologies, as well as being tied in with the beauty of Sundanese and Javanese princesses. Another aspect of her mythology was her ability to change shape and her appearance several times a day. Sultan Hamengkubuwono IX of Yogyakarta described his experience on spiritual encounters with the spirit Queen in his memoire; the queen could change shapes and appearance, as a beautiful young woman usually during full moon, and appear as an old woman at other times.

Kanjeng Ratu Kidul is in control of the violent waves of the Indian Ocean from her dwelling place in the heart of the ocean in a significant amount of the folklore that surrounds her. Sometimes she is referred as one of the spiritual queens or wives of the Susuhunan of Solo or Surakarta and the Sultan of Yogyakarta. Her literal positioning is considered as corresponding to the Merapi-Kraton-South Sea axis in the Solo Sultanate and Yogyakarta Sultanate.

Another pervasive part of folklore surrounding her is the color aqua green, gadhung m'lathi in Javanese, which is favored and referred to by her and is thus forbidden to wear along the southern coast of Java. She is often described as wearing clothes or selendang (silky sashes) in this color.

In popular culture
• The myth of Nyi Loro Kidul as the queen of southern ocean has become a popular source of inspiration in Indonesian culture, both traditional and modern.

• Some local traditional theater, particularly Sundanese Sandiwara and Javanese Kethoprak, may retell this legend in their performances. It has become the main theme of mystery, horror, and epic genres of Indonesian film and sinetron TV series.

• The tale of the Queen of the Southern Ocean has become the source of one of Mobile Legends: Bang Bang character, Kadita from Kingdom of Sunda. She is also the inspiration behind the song “Queen of the South” by the Bandung band The Panturas.

See also

 Bedhaya
 Cerita rakyat
 Javanese sacred places
 Kejawèn
 Manimekhala, a Sea Goddess worshipped in nearby Indochina
 Mazu, Chinese Goddess of Sea
 Dewi Sri, Goddess of Rice worshipped by Javanese, Balinese and Sundanese

Notes
 Becker, Judith. Gamelan Stories: Tantrism, Islam, and Aesthetics in Central Java. Arizona State University Program for Southeast Asian Studies, 1993.  (The Journal of Asian Studies, Vol. 56, No. 1 (Feb., 1997), pp. 246–247)
 Fischer, Joseph. assisted by James Danandjaja ... [et al.].The folk art of Java /  Kuala Lumpur; New York: Oxford University Press, 1994. .  Section – 8. Images of Ratu Kidul, Queen of the South Sea
 Olthof W.L. J.J. Meinsma, J.J. Ras Babad Tanah Jawi. Foris Publications Dordrecht-Holland/Providence-USA, 1987. 
 Mudjanto, G. The concept of power in Javanese culture. Gadjah Mada University Press, 1986. 
 Mulder, Niels. Inside Indonesian Society Cultural Change in Java. The Pepin Press, Amsterdam – Kuala Lumpur 1996. 
 Mulder, Niels.  Mysticism & Everyday Life in Contemporary Java. Singapore University Press, Second edition 1980.
 Schlehe, Judith. Die Meereskönigin des Südens, Ratu Kidul. Dietrich Reimer Verlag, Berlin 1998. 
 Schlehe, Judith. Versionen enier Wasserwelt: Die Geisterkönigin im javanischen Südmeer. B. hauser-Schäublin (Hg.) Script Ethnologische Frauenforshung, Berlin 1991

References

External links

 International Herald Tribune article about the sultan's relationship with the goddess
 Website dedicated to Gusti Kanjeng Ratu Kidul – in English
 "Harbor of the Queen" in English
Nyai Loro Kidul, the Queen of the Southern Sea
Indonesian Mystery Poem honoring Nyi Roro Kidul
Sultan Agung Nikahi Nyi Roro Kidul
The Sultan and the Mermaid Queen: Extraordinary Asian People and Places, and Things that Go Bump in the Night. Paul Spencer Sochaczewski (2008) Singapore: Editions Didier Millet. . Contains a long chapter on the Queen of the Southern Ocean and her relationship with current sultans of Java.

Sea and river goddesses
Water goddesses
Indonesian folklore
Javanese mythology
Javanese folklore
Sundanese mythology
Sundanese folklore
Indonesian goddesses